Santa María is a  north eastern department of Catamarca Province in Argentina.

Villages
 

Caspichango

See also
Chañar Punco

External links
 Santa María Webpage 

Departments of Catamarca Province